The Office is a  contemporary art gallery located in the centre of the old town of Nicosia in Cyprus near the boundaries of the Green Line, which makes Nicosia the last divided capital in Europe. The location is a stimulus for some artists who have exhibited their work in the Office gallery. It was founded in 2009 by the Greek Anastasios Gkekas. To date the gallery has mounted over 20 exhibitions by both European and non-European artists. In 2015 and 2016 the gallery, along with solo shows, mounted two group shows with works by local and international artists. The 2015 show titled "Investment Opportunities" consisted solely of works from the gallery's collection, and the 2016 show "To Express the Feelings of a Chair When We Sit on it" included works that were loaned for the purposes of this exhibition, accompanied by pieces from the gallery's collection.


Art Brussels 
In 2015, the Office gallery participated in the Art Brussels 2015 international art fair, presenting works by the Scottish artist Robert Montgomery and the Greek artist Dimitris Merantzas, entitled “Proof against the obtainment of new artwork”.

Local exhibitions 
 A PLACE TO WASH YOUR HEART - Charlotte Ballesteros, 6 October 2022 - 6 January 2023
 NAPK - THR // NIC INTONATIONS - Nazgol Ansarinia - Phanos Kyriacou, 6 December 2019 - 11 January 2020
Α CLOUD PASSING OVER CAIRO - Glavkos Koumides (&) Phanos Kyriakou - Broomberg & Chanarin, 2–14 May 2019
ISOLATO-SPLENDIDO-MARGINALE, Mario Carbone, 16 May - 27 June 2018
 Giornata, the Office, 22 May 2017
 LOST IN TIME, Patrick Bernatchez, Screenings: April 10, May 10, June 8, 2017
 To Express the Feelings of a Chair When We Sit on it, Group Show: Nazgol Ansarinia, Michelangelo Antonioni, Francis Bacon, Deepti Barth, Christos Th. Bokoros, Mario Carbone, Broomberg & Chanarin, Laurie Franck, Asteris Gkekas, Apollo Glykas, Bernhard Hosa, Glavkos Koumides, Dimitris Merantzas, Carol Christian Poell, 02 Oct 2016 - 22 Oct 2016
 Hyperkinesia, Bernhard Hosa, 30 Jun 2016 - 22 Jul 2016
 Yond.Side.Fore.Hind., Harris Gkekas, 07 Mar 2016
 Horsetail Knickerbelt, Delgado Fuchs, 20 Nov 2015 - 30 Nov 2015
 Investment Opportunities, Group Show: Günter Brus, Nazgol Ansarinia, Charlotte Ballesteros, Pascal Bernier, Cali Thornhill Dewitt, Elizabeth Hoak-Doering, Masahisa Fukase, Yannis Gaitis, Kurt Hentschläger, Andreas Karayan, Glavkos Koumides, Robert Montgomery, Andreas Nicolaou, Nicholas Panayi, Carol Christian Poell, Francesca Woodman, Soteris Kallis, Diamantis Diamantopoulos, 10 Sep 2015 - 13 Oct 2015
 All Kingdoms smashed and buried in the sky, Robert Montgomery, 18 Dec 2014 - 17 Jan 2015
 Selbstverstrickung, Günter Brus, 2 Jun 2014 - 30 Jun 2014
 Transgression, Deepti Barth, 24 Oct 2013 - 16 Nov 2013
 Cluster, Kurt Hentschläger, 10 May 2013 - 31 May 2013
 Foundations and Remains, Polly Morgan, 11 Apr 2013 - 5 May 2013
 The Last Bride, Asteris Gkekas, 21 Mar 2013 - 5 Apr 2013
 ‘Οδός Ελευθερίας’, Christos Bokoros, 01 Jun 2012 - 30 Jun 2012
 Carthago Delenda Est, Nicolas Panayi, 24 Oct 2011 - 31 Oct 2011
 Scars are Like Flowers, Charlotte Ballesteros + Hubert Marot, 07 Jul 2011
 Apollon Glykas, Η Βιτρίνα, 20 Jun 2011
 Nicolas Panayi, Τα Πάθη, 18 Apr 2011
 Υποδήματα, Asteris Gkekas, 05 Nov 2010 - 30 Nov 2010
 Το ταξίδι ΙΙ, Andreas Nicolaou, 04 Jun 2010 - 30 Jun 2010
 Arrest, Nicolas Panayi, 11 Nov 2009 - 25 Nov 2009

International exhibitions
Art Brussels, 25 Apr 2015 - 27 Apr 2015

Image Gallery

References

External links
 

Visual arts exhibitions
Contemporary art galleries in Europe
Museums in Nicosia
Cypriot culture
Art galleries established in 2009